Stokke is a town in Sandefjord municipality in Vestfold County, Norway. It lies in-between Sandefjord and Tønsberg, two of Vestfold's largest cities. It was a municipality from 1838 to 2016. The administrative centre of the municipality was the village of Stokke, while minor villages were Vear, Melsomvik, Storevar, and Valberg.

On 1 January 2017, the municipality, along with Andebu, became a part of Sandefjord municipality. The village of Vear was transferred from Stokke to neighboring Tønsberg on the same day. The town of Stokke was home to 3,391 inhabitants as of 2016. The decision to merge into Sandefjord was part of a nationwide municipal reform by the Solberg Cabinet. 77.8 percent of Stokke residents voted to merge into Sandefjord during the September 2015 elections.

General information

Name
The municipality (originally the parish) is named after the old Stokke farm (Old Norse: Stokkar), since the first church was built here. (This is probably referring to some hills/ridges near the churchsite.)

Coat-of-arms
The coat-of-arms is from modern times.  They were granted on 13 January 1984.   The arms are canting since stokker means "sticks" or "logs". The arms show three gold-colored tree trunks on a red background.

History
16,000 artifacts have been recorded at Brunstad in Stokke, mostly tools out of flint but also roughly sixty hearths. The first recorded grave from Mesolithic times is also found here and dated to 5900 BCE.

Municipal history

The municipality of Stokke was established on 1 January 1838 (see formannskapsdistrikt). Two islands were later transferred from the municipality of Stokke to the neighboring municipality of Nøtterøy: Håøya, (in 1901) and Veierland (in 1964).

Relatively few Stokke residents read Sandefjords Blad, the main newspaper of Sandefjord, and few residents reside or work in Sandefjord proper. The wealthiness of Sandefjord, however, was often used as an argument for the merge with Sandefjord. Its international airport Torp was also seen as a deciding factor for Stokke's decision to merge into Sandefjord. For the village of Vear, on the other hand, a majority of residents preferred a merge into neighboring Tønsberg. Consequentially, the village was transferred into Tønsberg on 1 January 2017, the day Stokke joined Sandefjord. Vear is home to 2,500 residents as of 2016, which made up 22 percent of Stokke's total population prior to the merge.

Sundås Fort

Remains of a fort, the Sundås battery, can be found across the Tønsberg Fjord from Håøya Island. The fortifications were constructed in the late 19th century during turbulent times with Sweden during the Union between Sweden and Norway. It was part of the newly established Norwegian Coastal Artillery ("Kystartilleriet"). The fort was erected to keep potential enemies from entering Tønsberg by sea, and was also meant to protect the Marine harbor in Melsomvik village. Work on the fort began in 1897, and the forts at both Håøya Island and Sundåsen were completed in 1899. Trenches, commando posts, fencing, concrete gun pits, and other remains from the fort can still be seen at Sundås. The fort lies by the Tønsberg Fjord with surrounding views of Færder Lighthouse and islands such as Håøya, Tjøme, Veierland, and Nøtterøy. The cannons were demolished by German forces in 1942 during the German occupation of Norway. The Norwegian Armed Forces remained in control of the fort from 1945 until 1962, when it became public property.

Geography

Stokke municipality had a total area of 118 km2 and had a 14 km coastline along the Tønsbergfjord. Stokke is a town and a former municipality located within the municipality of Sandefjord in Vestfold County. The town of Stokke is located in-between the cities of Tønsberg and Sandefjord. However, Stokke is primarily a rural community and far smaller than its neighboring cities. It consists of a variety of recreation areas, including the Storås area, which includes lakes, rivers, historic sites, and an abundance of plant- and wildlife species. Another recreational site is located at Bogen, which also includes a beach and an art gallery. Other coastal communities include the villages of Vear, Melsomvik, and Storevar. Islands include Langø, Ravnø, Gåsø, Gåsøkalven, Verjø, Tryteknatten, and others. Lakes include Akersvannet, Gjennestadvannet, Kulerødvannet, Fossnesdammen, and others. The former municipality bordered Andebu and Kodal in the west, Sandefjord in the south, the Tønsbergfjord in the east, and Tønsberg and Ramnes in the north.

Both the railway line Vestfold Line and the highway European Route E18 pass through the former municipality. Its highest point was Høgståsen at 175.6 meters. The village of Stokke is home to a nature preserve known as Bokemoa, a birch forest located on Raet. The dense forest creates shade and a habitat for mushrooms; over 100 species of mushrooms have been recorded in Bokemoa, including species only found in birch tree forests.

Nature preserves
Nature preserves in Stokke include the island of Langø, Bokemoa, Melsomvik plant and wildlife preserve as well as the lakes Robergvannet and Akersvannet. Langø Island lies in the Tønsberg Fjord and is a car-free island consisting of meadows, knolls, salt meadows, small bays, and forests. It became a landscape conservation area in 2006. It is known for its wide variety of rare wildflowers including species such as sea thrift, alternate-leaved golden-saxifrage, cowslip, greater yellow-rattle, sticky catchfly, and many others.

Demographics
The annual population growth is twice as high as Vestfold County as a whole, and the expected life expectancy is higher than the county median. 13 percent of Stokke's population were first- or second-generation immigrants as of 2014.

Transportation
European route E18 intersects the former municipality. Vestfoldbanen operates a railway station in the town of Stokke, Stokke Station, and Sandefjord Airport Torp is located on the former border to Sandefjord.

Recreation

Hiking trails can be found at Trælsodden, Løke, Høgåsen, Grorudvannet, Feen, Furulund, Ramsum, and Borgeskogen. Coastal hiking paths make up a total of 14 km in former municipality. Coastal hiking trails can be found in Melsomvik and also a trail connecting Storevar and Rakkevik.

A 3 km forest hike can be found at Løke, which is a popular forest for collecting mushrooms. A mountain trail is located by Høgåsen, the highest point in the former municipality with an elevation of 172 meters. The peak can be reached from two trails: from Langevann in Re or from Grorudvannet in Stokke. The shortest hike is from Grorudvannet.

Trælsodden by the Tønsberg Fjord is home to several burial mounds as well as fortifications dated to World War II. Sandy beaches, diving boards and hiking trails can also be found at Trælsodden. At Trælsodden are graves dated to the Iron Age. At the time, sea levels were 4–5 meters higher than today, and the graves were consequentially placed near the shoreline. A popular fishing site is located between Trælsodden and Brunstad. The trail goes by the municipal beach at Brunstad, immediately south of Oslofjord Convention Center. During summers, convenience stores and seafood restaurants are open at Brunstad. From Brunstad, the coastal path heads inwards and passes through the Himalayapark, a park offering tree climbing. The trail passes by a home built by singer Jahn Teigen, known as "Teigen's Pyramid". The trail reaches a beach before entering the boat harbor in Rakkevik. It is a 3.5 km hike from Storevar to Melsomvik, and a similar distance between Melsomvik and Brunstad.

Wildlife
Brown bears were common until the 1850s, and until the early 1900s, a group of bears lived in the inner parts of Vestfold County. The last Brown bear shot in the county was in Lardal in 1916. The last bear to be shot in Stokke was around 1850 by Andreas Smitten of Russeltvet. A number of local place names derives from its former bears, including Bjønnemyra (Borgen), Bjønnestøkket (Bredholt), Bjønndal (Hauanlia), Bjønneleet (Nedre Anholt), and Bjønnelia (Askerød). Some place names also derive from the Gray wolf, including Ulvekula (Oserød) and Ulvehølet (Rørkollskogen). Other notable mammals in Stokke include the Red fox, European badger, European otter, European pine marten, Short-tailed weasel, European Lynx, Moose, Roe deer, Red deer, European beaver, Mountain hare, Red squirrel, European hedgehog, bats, mice, and rats.

Points of interest

 Stokke Bygdetun, oldest village museum in Vestfold County, established in 1978.
 Sundås Fort, 1899 fortifications constructed during the Union between Sweden and Norway.
 Trælsodden, beach and remains from fortifications and burial mounds.
 Brunstad Beach
 Oslofjord Convention Center
 Stokke Station, railway station operated by Vestfoldbanen
 Bokemoa, birch tree forest and nature preserve on Raet
 Bogen, beach and hiking trails
 Storevar, small coastal village
 Stokke Church, brick church by architect Jacob Wilhelm Nordan from 1886.

Notable people from Stokke
 Einar Tørnquist, TV-personality, talk-show host and podcaster
 Lise Davidsen, opera singer

References

External links

Municipal fact sheet from Statistics Norway

 
Municipalities of Vestfold og Telemark
Villages in Vestfold og Telemark

nl:Stokke (plaats)